The North Dakota Cowboy Hall of Fame is a cowboy hall of fame. Established in 1995, the hall of fame endeavors to preserve and uphold the historic and modern western lifestyle throughout the state as it pertains to Native Americans, rodeo, and ranching.

Inductees 

Sources:

References

External links 
 Official Website

1995 establishments in North Dakota
Cowboy halls of fame
Halls of fame in North Dakota
Sports halls of fame
Sports hall of fame inductees
Awards established in 1995
Museums established in 1995
Sports museums in North Dakota
Lists of sports awards